Bente Becker (born 12 August 1985) is a Dutch politician serving as a member of the House of Representatives since 2017. She is a member of the People's Party for Freedom and Democracy (VVD).

References

External links 
 Official Website

1985 births
Living people
21st-century Dutch women politicians
21st-century Dutch politicians
Members of the House of Representatives (Netherlands)
People from Almere
People's Party for Freedom and Democracy politicians
20th-century Dutch women
20th-century Dutch people